
The University of the Arts Bern is an art school with locations in Bern and Biel/Bienne. It was created in 2003 from the merger of the University of Music and Theatre and the School of Design, Art and Conservation. The educational institution is one of eight departments of the Bern University of Applied Sciences. Students and lecturers of the HKB come from over 30 countries. The HKB works in research and as an organizer according to information closely with Swiss and international partners from culture, society and economy together, enabling even large-scale projects such as the Biennale Bern. It also contributes to cultural life in Berne.

Departments 
Departments at the University of the Arts include music, design and art, opera, theater, conservation and restoration, the Swiss Literature Institute and the Y Institute. It offers internationally recognized Bachelor and Master courses in these departments. Since 2006, the  has been a part of the school. The Y Institute is a center for interdisciplinary teaching and works at the interfaces of art and science.

Notable alumni 
The HKB and its predecessor institutions such as the Bern Conservatory and the School for Music and Theatre Bern have trained many famous artists. These include:

Elina Duni, Swiss-Albanian singer and composer
Dorothee Elmiger, Swiss writer
Linda Geiser, Swiss actress
Rebecca Indermaur, Swiss actress
Patricia Kopatchinskaja, Moldovan-Austrian violinist
Stefan Kurt, Swiss actor
Gwendolyn Masin, Dutch-Irish violinist
Matthias Nawrat, German writer
Andreas Reize, Swiss organist and conductor, Thomaskantor
Maximilian Schell, Swiss actor, director, and producer
Martin Schenkel, Swiss actor and musician
Latefa Wiersch, German visual artist
Luzia von Wyl, Swiss pianist and composer
Kaspar Zehnder, Swiss conductor and flutist

References

External links 
 
 Official website

Biel/Bienne
2003 establishments in Switzerland
Educational institutions established in 2003
Universities in Switzerland
Music schools in Switzerland
Schools in Bern
University of Bern